Alexandr Tarabrin (also Aleksandr, ; born 24 April 1985) is a Kazakhstani backstroke swimmer. He is a former member of the swimming team for Volgograd State Academy of Physical Education, and is coached and trained by Azabat Sarbasov in Almaty.

Tarabrin qualified for two swimming events at the 2012 Summer Olympics in London, by clearing FINA B-standard entry times of 54.85 (100 m backstroke) and 2:00.75 (200 m backstroke) from the Russian Championships in Moscow. On 18 July 2012, IOC had approved his legal nationality transfer from Russia in order for him to be eligible and represent Kazakhstan at these games.

In the 100 m backstroke, Tarabrin challenged seven other swimmers on the second heat, including Olympic veterans George Bovell of Trinidad and Tobago and Omar Pinzón of Colombia. He raced to sixth place and thirty-eighth overall by four hundredths of a second (0.04) behind South Korea's Park Seon-Kwan in 55.55. In the 200 m backstroke, Tarabrin touched out another South Korean swimmer Park Hyung-Joo to repeat a sixth-place finish in the same heat by 0.28 of a second in 2:01.22. Tarabrin failed to advance into the semifinals, as he placed thirtieth overall in the preliminaries.

References

External links

NBC Olympics Profile

1985 births
Living people
Kazakhstani male backstroke swimmers
Olympic swimmers of Kazakhstan
Swimmers at the 2012 Summer Olympics
Kazakhstani people of Russian descent
Sportspeople from Volgograd
Sportspeople from Almaty
Swimmers at the 2014 Asian Games
Asian Games competitors for Kazakhstan
20th-century Kazakhstani people
21st-century Kazakhstani people